Capuava is a train station on CPTM Line 10-Turquoise, located in the city of Mauá. It was opened in 1920 as a telegraph post and, in 1960, its original building was replaced by the one who is up until today.

References

Companhia Paulista de Trens Metropolitanos stations
Railway stations opened in 1920
Railway stations opened in 1960